The following is a list of all IFT-licensed over-the-air television stations broadcasting in the Mexican state of Guerrero. There are 25 television stations in Guerrero.

List of television stations

|-

|-

|-

|-

|-

|-

|-

|-

|-

|-

|-

|-

|-

|-

|-

|-

|-

|-

|-

|-

|-

|-

|-

|-

|-

References

Television stations in Guerrero
Guerrero